Ali Naci Karacan (1896 – 7 July 1955) was a Turkish journalist and publisher. He was involved in founding the Turkish daily newspapers Akşam (1918) and Milliyet (1955), and his family, including grandson Ali Naci Karacan, built up a publishing group around Milliyet. He was the President of Fenerbahçe S.K. (1926–1927), and the editor of the newly founded Tan from 1935. Born Ali Naci, he later took the additional surname Karacan.

The Ali Naci Karacan Stadı in Gönyeli is named for him.

Books
 Naci Karacan, Ali. Ya Hürriyet Ya Ölüm (1934)
 Naci Karacan, Ali. Lozan Konferansı ve İsmet pașa (1943) – on the Conference of Lausanne and İsmet İnönü
 Tanju, Sadun. Doludizgin: Ali Naci Karacan, bir gazetecinin hayatı. Karacan, 1986.

References 

1896 births
1955 deaths
Businesspeople from Istanbul
Milliyet people
Akşam people
Journalists from Istanbul
Fenerbahçe S.K. presidents
Place of birth missing
Date of birth missing
Turkish newspaper publishers (people)
Turkish newspaper chain founders
20th-century journalists